The 2018 Fr8Auctions 250 was the 19th stock car race of the 2018 NASCAR Camping World Truck Series season, the third and final race of the Round of 8, and the 13th iteration of the event. The race was held on Saturday, October 13, 2018, Lincoln, Alabama at Talladega Superspeedway, a 2.66 miles (4.28 km) permanent triangle-shaped superspeedway. The race took the scheduled 94 laps to complete. At race's end, GMS Racing driver Timothy Peters would win under caution after a wild wreck on the backstretch that featured Noah Gragson throwing a block on Peters, spinning in the process. The win was Peters' 11th and to date, final NASCAR Camping World Truck Series win and his first and only win of the season. To fill out the podium, Myatt Snider of ThorSport Racing and David Gilliland of Kyle Busch Motorsports would finish second and third, respectively.

Background 

Talladega Superspeedway, originally known as Alabama International Motor Superspeedway (AIMS), is a motorsports complex located north of Talladega, Alabama. It is located on the former Anniston Air Force Base in the small city of Lincoln. The track is a tri-oval and was constructed in the 1960s by the International Speedway Corporation, a business controlled by the France family. Talladega is most known for its steep banking and the unique location of the start/finish line that's located just past the exit to pit road. The track currently hosts the NASCAR series such as the NASCAR Cup Series, Xfinity Series and the Camping World Truck Series. Talladega is the longest NASCAR oval with a length of 2.66-mile-long (4.28 km) tri-oval like the Daytona International Speedway, which also is a 2.5-mile-long (4 km) tri-oval.

Entry list

Practice

First practice 
The first practice session was held on Friday, October 12, at 9:05 AM CST, and would last for 50 minutes.

Second and final practice 
The second and final practice session, sometimes referred to as Happy Hour, was held on Friday, October 12, at 10:35 AM CST, and would last for 50 minutes.

Qualifying 
Qualifying was held on Friday, October 12, at 4:35 PM CST. Since Talladega Superspeedway is at least a 1.5 miles (2.4 km) racetrack, the qualifying system was a single car, single lap, two round system where in the first round, everyone would set a time to determine positions 13–32. Then, the fastest 12 qualifiers would move on to the second round to determine positions 1–12.

Four drivers would fail to qualify: Norm Benning, Joey Gase, Ray Ciccarelli, and Jamie Mosley.

Full qualifying results

Race results 
Stage 1 Laps: 20

Stage 2 Laps: 20

Stage 1 Laps: 54

References 

2018 NASCAR Camping World Truck Series
NASCAR races at Talladega Superspeedway
October 2018 sports events in the United States
2018 in sports in Alabama